Alamnagar Assembly constituency is an assembly constituency in Madhepura district in the Indian state of Bihar.

Overview
As per Delimitation of Parliamentary and Assembly constituencies Order, 2008, No. 70 Alamnagar Assembly constituency is composed of the following: Alamnagar, Puraini and Chausa community development blocks; Rahta Phanhan, Nayanagar, Sahjadpur, Lashkari, Manjora, Jotaili, Khara, Budhma and Gopalpur of Udakishunganj CD Block.

Alamnagar Assembly constituency is part of No. 13 Madhepura (Lok Sabha constituency).

Members of Legislative Assembly

Election results

2020

References

External links
 

Assembly constituencies of Bihar
Politics of Madhepura district